An Byeong-hun (born 17 September 1991), also known as Byeong-Hun An or Ben An, is a professional golfer from Seoul, South Korea. In August 2009, he became the youngest-ever winner of the U.S. Amateur.

Amateur career
Born in Seoul, South Korea, An is the son of South Korean Ahn Jae-Hyung and Chinese Jiao Zhimin, both of whom were medalists in table tennis at the 1988 Summer Olympics in Seoul.

An moved to the United States in December 2005 to attend the David Leadbetter Golf Academy in Bradenton, Florida, where he was also known as Ben An.

In August 2009, at age 17, An became the youngest-ever winner of the U.S. Amateur when he defeated Ben Martin 7 & 5 in the 36-hole final at Southern Hills Country Club in Tulsa, Oklahoma. He made his PGA Tour debut in March 2010 at the Arnold Palmer Invitational, two weeks before playing in The Masters. An made the cut at the 2010 Verizon Heritage and was one shot off the lead during the second round before finishing the tournament T-59.

At the 2010 U.S. Amateur, An became the first defending champion to advance to the semifinals since Tiger Woods in 1996. After An took a 3-up lead after nine holes in his semifinal match, his opponent David Chung rallied to defeat An 1-up.

Professional career
An turned professional in 2011 and earned a spot on the Challenge Tour via three stages of qualifying school.

In June 2013, An had his best finish to date on the Challenge Tour, tied for second place at the Scottish Hydro Challenge. In August 2014, he won his first Challenge Tour event at the Rolex Trophy, making An the first Korean to win on the Challenge Tour.  He finished 2014 in third place in the Challenge Tour Rankings, and moved up to the European Tour.

In May 2015, he won the BMW PGA Championship at Wentworth.  He was only the second player to win both the U.S. Amateur and the British PGA Championship, after Arnold Palmer.

In 2016, An played the Zurich Classic of New Orleans on an exemption, and lost a playoff at the first hole.  In 2016, he earned enough money as a non-member to gain a PGA Tour card for 2016–17.

In December 2019, An played on the International team at the 2019 Presidents Cup at Royal Melbourne Golf Club in Australia. The U.S. team won 16–14. An went 1–2–2 and lost his Sunday singles match against Webb Simpson.

Amateur wins
2009 U.S. Amateur

Professional wins (4)

European Tour wins (1)

Korn Ferry Tour wins (1)

Challenge Tour wins (1)

Korean Tour wins (1)

Playoff record
PGA Tour playoff record (0–2)

Results in major championships
Results not in chronological order in 2020.

CUT = missed the half-way cut
"T" indicates a tie for a place
NT = No tournament due to COVID-19 pandemic

Summary

Most consecutive cuts made – 4 (2017 PGA – 2018 PGA)
Longest streak of top-10s – none

Results in The Players Championship

CUT = missed the halfway cut
"T" indicates a tie for a place
C = Cancelled after the first round due to the COVID-19 pandemic

Results in World Golf Championships

1Cancelled due to COVID-19 pandemic

QF, R16, R32, R64 = Round in which player lost in match play
NT = No tournament
"T" = Tied

Team appearances
Professional
EurAsia Cup (representing Asia): 2016, 2018
World Cup (representing South Korea): 2016, 2018
Presidents Cup (representing the International team): 2019

See also
2014 Challenge Tour graduates
2022 Korn Ferry Tour Finals graduates

References

External links

South Korean male golfers
European Tour golfers
PGA Tour golfers
Olympic golfers of South Korea
Golfers at the 2016 Summer Olympics
Korn Ferry Tour graduates
Golfers from Seoul
Sportspeople from Bradenton, Florida
Golfers from Orlando, Florida
South Korean people of Chinese descent
1991 births
Living people